The Washington Capitols were a former Basketball Association of America (forerunner of the National Basketball Association) team based in Washington, D.C. from 1946 to 1951. The team was coached from 1946 to 1949 by NBA Hall of Famer Red Auerbach.

History

The team was founded in 1946 as a charter BAA team; it became a charter NBA team in 1949. It folded on January 9, 1951 (with a 10–25 record).

The Capitols were one of seven teams that quickly left the NBA: The NBA contracted after the 1949-1950 season, losing six teams: The Anderson Packers, Sheboygan Red Skins and Waterloo Hawks jumped to the NPBL, while the Chicago Stags, Denver Nuggets and St. Louis Bombers folded.  The league went from 17 teams to 11 before the 1950-1951 season started. Midway through the 1950-1951 season, the Washington Capitols folded as well, bringing the number of teams in the league down to ten.  

Earl Lloyd, the first African American athlete to play for an NBA team, debuted for the Capitols at Uline Arena on October 31, 1950. 

The franchise played the 1951–52 season in the American Basketball League, but the team folded again in January, 1952.

The teams wore green and white.  The NBA returned to the Washington, D.C. area in 1973, when the Baltimore Bullets became the Capital Bullets, now known as the Washington Wizards.

The Capitols' 81.7 win percentage in the BAA's inaugural season was the highest in the NBA until surpassed by the Philadelphia 76ers in 1966–67. The Capitols captured two Divisional Championships: (1946–47 and 1948–49) and made the playoffs in (1947, 1948 tie-breaker, 1949 and 1950).

Winning streaks

The Washington Capitols are also noteworthy for two long win streaks during their short history.  In 1946, the Capitols won 17 straight games — a single season streak that remained the NBA's longest until 1969.  The 15–0 start of the 1948–49 team was the best in NBA history until the Golden State Warriors broke it in 2015–16 by starting 24-0, though the Houston Rockets had previously tied the Capitols' record in 1993–94.

The arena
The Capitols played in historic Uline Arena, located at 1132, 1140, and 1146 3rd St. NE, Washington, District of Columbia. The capacity was 7,500. The facility still exists and has been repurposed into retail and office space.

Players of note

Basketball Hall of Fame

Notes:
 1 Lloyd was inducted as a contributor as the first African American player and bench coach in the NBA.

Notable alumni
 Gene Gallette (1946–1947)
 Jack Nichols (1949–1950)
 Don Otten (1949–1951)
 Fred Scolari (1946–1951)

Leading scorers by season
1947 – Bob Feerick – 16.8 ppg
1948 – Bob Feerick – 16.1 ppg
1949 – Bob Feerick – 13.0 ppg
1950 – Don Otten – 14.9 ppg (in 18 games. Jack Nichols scored 13.1 over 49 games, but Fred Scolari scored the most points, with 860 in 66 games.)
1951 – Bill Sharman – 12.2 ppg

Coaches and others
1947–1949 – Red Auerbach
1950 – Bob Feerick – player-coach
1951 – Bones McKinney – player-coach
1950 – Earl Lloyd – first African American to play in the NBA

Season-by-season records

 The inaugural 1947 BAA Playoffs did not establish Eastern and Western champions and generated one finalist from the East, one from the West, only by coincidence. Washington and Chicago won the Eastern and Western Divisions and met in a best-of-seven series to determine one league championship finalist. (Washington lost the first two games, both at home, by 16 points each and lost the series four games to two; every game but the last was decided by at least 10 points.) Meanwhile, four runners-up played best-of-three matches to determine the other finalist. Philadelphia, second in the East, won that runners-up bracket and defeated Chicago in a best-of-seven series to win the BAA championship.

 The Capitols folded midway during the season on January 9, 1951.

References

External links
Washington Capitols history
Team page at Basketball-reference.com

 
Defunct National Basketball Association teams
Basketball Association of America teams
Basketball teams in Washington, D.C.
Basketball teams established in 1946
Basketball teams disestablished in 1951
1946 establishments in Washington, D.C.
1951 disestablishments in Washington, D.C.